Kavkamakhi (Dargwa: Кабка-махьи) is a rural locality (a selo) in Akushinsky District, Republic of Dagestan, Russia. The population was 1,408 as of 2010. There are 11 streets.

Geography 
Kavkamakhi is located 9 km northwest of Akusha (the district's administrative centre) by road, on the Akusha River. Kurimakhi is the nearest rural locality.

References 

Rural localities in Akushinsky District